Sonya McLaughlin Halpern (born October 11, 1967) is an American politician and former marketing executive who is a member of the Georgia State Senate representing the 39th district. Elected in December 2020 in a special Democratic primary election, she is currently serving her first term.

Education 
Halpern earned a Bachelor of Arts degree in mass communication from the University of Massachusetts Amherst and a Master of Business Administration from the University of Hartford.

Career 
Halpern has worked in communications, advertising, and marketing. She worked in advertising sales at The Walt Disney Company, ESPN, and Cox Enterprises. She has also been a member of various boards and non-profits. Halpern is the founder of Whiskey in a Teacup ("WIAT") Consulting, a creative and communications consultancy firm. She was also the first African-American and first person from Georgia to chair the President’s Advisory Committee on the Arts under Barack Obama.

After Nikema Williams was selected to replace John Lewis on the November ballot for Georgia's 5th congressional district, Halpern announced her candidacy for the special election to succeed her in the Georgia State Senate. She placed first in the special Democratic primary and defeated Linda Pritchett in the Democratic runoff.

Halpern was sworn in on January 11, 2021. She currently serves on the Banking and Financial Institutions Committee, the Education and Youth Committee, the Health and Human Services Committee, and the State Institutions and Property Committee.

Personal life 
Halpern and her husband, Daniel, have two sons  and a daughter. Halpern's husband is the co-founder and CEO of Jackmont Hospitality, a minority-owned foodservice management company based in the Atlanta metropolitan area.

References

External links
 Profile at the Georgia State Senate

Living people
Women state legislators in Georgia (U.S. state)
African-American state legislators in Georgia (U.S. state)
University of Massachusetts Amherst College of Social and Behavioral Sciences alumni
University of Hartford alumni
Politicians from Atlanta
Businesspeople from Atlanta
Democratic Party Georgia (U.S. state) state senators
21st-century American businesspeople
21st-century American businesswomen
21st-century American politicians
21st-century American women politicians
21st-century African-American women
21st-century African-American politicians
1967 births